Oscar A. Carlson High School in Gibraltar, Michigan, United States, is located near mouth of the Detroit River at Lake Erie. It is a member of the Gibraltar School District, serving the five municipalities of Gibraltar, Flat Rock, Woodhaven, Rockwood, and Brownstown Township. It is a member of the Downriver Consortium along with nine other competitive high schools and local community colleges.

Sports
The competitive cheerleading team has won MHSAA state championships in 1995, 2008, 2009, 2011, 2012, 2013, 2014, 2015, 2016, 2018, and 2019.

Notable alumni
 Shelley Looney (1990) - 1998 Olympic gold medalist in ice hockey
 John Schreiber (2012) - MLB pitcher

References

External links
 Carlson High School website

Public high schools in Michigan
Schools in Wayne County, Michigan